This is a list of episodes from the sixth season of Columbo.

Broadcast history
The season originally aired Sundays at 8:00–9:30 pm (EST) as part of The NBC Sunday Mystery Movie.

DVD release
The season was released on DVD by Universal Studios Home Entertainment along with season seven, under its Universal Classic Television classic TV entertainment programming series.

Episodes

References

Columbo 06
1976 American television seasons
1977 American television seasons